Dorval-Jean XXIII is a high school located in the city of Dorval on the Island of Montreal.  It is a French school which has two buildings. The first building contains Secondary I, II and the welcome classes, while the other building contains Secondary III, IV, V and other welcome classes. The school has around 1900 pupils. Dorval Jean-XXIII is located near the Centre Sportif Dorval.
Dorval Jean XXIII was the site of the music video for the song Titanium, by David Guetta.

External links

http://www.csmb.qc.ca/~/media/Images/etablissements/secondaire/jean-xxiii-1.ashx

High schools in Montreal